Singupuram is a census town in the Indian state of Andhra Pradesh.

Geography 
It is located 11 kilometers(km) east of the district headquarters of Srikakulam district, 9 km from Srikakulam and 100 km from the State capital Visakhapatnam.

Demographics
According to the 2011 census of India, Singupuram had a population of 12,273 with 2,774 households.

Healthcare
A Primary Health Centre (PHC) is located there along with four to five private hospitals.

Transport
National Highway 16 bypasses the town and is a part of the Golden Quadrilateral highway network. Srikakulam is the nearest city to Singupuram, approximately 7 km southwest of Singupuram. Road connectivity is also present from Srikakulam to Singupuram.

SH37 connects Singupuram town with Parvathipuram, Veeraghattam, Palakonda, Kalingapatnam.

Education

Colleges 
 Gurajada Education
 Vaishnavi engineering college
 SISTAM engineering college

Schools 
 ZPHS
 M.P.P School
 Kgvb Srikakulam
 Sarada Vidyaniketan
 Kv singupuram
 Shiva Sivani Public School
 Vidatri vidyalayam
 Keshava Reddy School
 Gayatri school
 Kendriya Vidyalayam

Politics
Two days before polling in the 2004 elections, Kinjarapu Yerran Naidu survived an assassination attempt by Naxalites (Maoists) who attempted to bomb his vehicle in Singupuram. Following his re-election, he was made the party leader in the Lok Sabha.

Gallery

References

 Cities and towns in Srikakulam district